Eupithecia mecodaedala is a moth in the family Geometridae. It is found in Kenya.

Subspecies
Eupithecia mecodaedala mecodaedala
Eupithecia mecodaedala holmi D. S. Fletcher, 1958

References

Endemic moths of Kenya
Moths described in 1932
mecodaedala
Moths of Africa